The Unquiet Earth is Denise Giardina's third novel. It was published in 1992 and won the W.D. Weatherford Award that year.

Plot summary
The Unquiet Earth is a novel written from the perspective of multiple narrators. The three main narrators are Dillon, Rachel, and Jackie who are all family. Dillon is Rachel's younger cousin, and Jackie is most likely their child.

The story begins prior to the birth of Jackie and is narrated by Dillon and Rachel, children living on their family land, the Homeplace. From the beginning, Dillon makes claims that he loves Rachel partially because she is the only one who has memories of his father. They both narrate parts of their childhood and the beginning of the novel mainly depicts how their relationship grows and how their love for one another begins. They are first cousins - therefore, their mothers are sisters. The first instance in which their love is really shown is when Rachel falls into a river and Dillon is forcibly restrained by his mother from diving in to save her because of her fear of losing him as well. He is forced to watch Rachel suffer and nearly be swept away by the current, but luckily she was dragged out by the mule she was riding. They rush her home, and Dillon watches through a window as his mother helps a cold and naked Rachel recover.

The story continues as they grow older and continue to fight for love. Rachel ends up leaving the Homeplace to attend a nursing school, where she spends several subsequent years. Dillon then, in what everyone believes is out of anger of Rachel leaving him, enlists in the British army to fight against Hitler. Upon Rachel's graduation from nursing school, she and her friend Tommie Justice enlist as nurses in the war as well. Rachel returns to find out that the Homeplace is no longer their land as Dillon had forewarned her many times. They are reunited at the number thirteen mine in Justice County where the remainder of the story takes place. Rachel continues working there as a county nurse, and Dillon works for the mine while avidly fighting for the union against the American Coal Company and Arthur Lee, who owns it. Arthur Lee is already an acquaintance of Rachel's because he dated her friend Tommie previously and introduced her to his friend Tony.

Rachel and Dillon continue to fight and disagree about their love for one another. Rachel is scared that they would be deemed illegitimate by society and tries to deny her love for her cousin. This offends and angers Dillon, who is against the social norms and wishes to love Rachel even if society believes it is the wrong thing to do. He wants to marry Rachel, but it is illegal to marry a first cousin. When the trouble with the coal company gets worse, Dillon asks that Rachel leave her job for the county, and help him in the fight against the coal companies as the other wives were doing. However, Dillon and Rachel were raised differently, and the words of her dying mother echoed in her head. She was raised by her mother to believe that men want a prim and proper lady, certainly not one who has sex before marriage. It would be wrong for kin to sleep with kin, and even more wrong for two first cousins to marry one another. Standing strong in these beliefs, Rachel ends up marrying Tony, an Italian man that Tommie and Arthur Lee set her up with. She has trouble having kids with Tony and continues to stay close to Dillon. Eventually, she gives into the fact that she loves Dillon and they make love in the secluded area of Trace Mountain where they conceive their daughter, Jackie. However, throughout the rest of the novel this escape to the mountain is kept quiet and Jackie believes until the very end that Tony is her father. After Rachel and Tony finally divorce due to an unhappy marriage and his escapes to the bar, Tony gets remarried and has trouble again having babies. Rachel fears that this will cause him suspicion of Jackie being his and that he will try to take her away.

Dillon's prior paranoia is justified at the end of the novel. The book closes with the breaking of the dawn above the towns, and eventually shows once again that the mining company's guarantee of safety was untrue. Jackie is left alone after the deaths of Tom and Dillon in the flood and moves away. The story closes with Jackie wanting to forget the place she called home. The book does a good job of creating a scene of mountain utopia that was slowly eroded away by the mining to an area that was undesirable and almost uninhabitable.

Historical fiction
Geographic Setting
The beginning of the story is set in the 1930s and continues through 1990 in coal mining country near the West Virginia and Kentucky border. The book contains a hand-drawn map that shows towns, rivers and creeks, mountains, and mining camps that are referenced in the story. Most of the map focuses on Justice County, West Virginia, and the adjacent West Virginia county of McDowell and Paine County, Kentucky. McDowell County is an actual county on West Virginia's southwest border, but both Justice County and Paine County are fictional. The fictional Justice County takes the place of Mingo County, the site of the Mingo County coal war and the Matewan Massacre.

The Television People
Jackie Honaker finds herself an innocent victim of American news media propaganda. There is a news group reporting on Christmas in Appalachia. Rachel Honaker brings them to Jackie's school to film part of their report. The news crew first asks to film in the cafeteria, then the library, only to discover the school has neither. Announcing that they need to have a location large enough to distribute shoes donated by a New Jersey shoe company, the news crew hints that the true purpose of their documentary is to portray the region as one of extreme poverty and disarray. Jackie's teacher, Miss Cox, tells the class the true reason behind the news crew's presence. Many of the students neither want nor need shoes and do not wish to participate, but the news group exploits the innocence of their youth, bribing them with the opportunity to be on television if they will line up to receive shoes. Afterward, some of the students throw away their shoes.

Federal Assistance to Appalachia
One of the secondary characters, Tom Kolwiecki, is from New Jersey. Tom is a volunteer and part of the VISTA (Volunteers in Service to America) program, and his character is regularly referred to as ' the VISTA' by the inhabitants of the mining community. The VISTA program is a real program and part of the AmeriCorps organization that promotes community service. The VISTA program grew into prominence with the passage of the Economic Opportunity Act of 1964 signed by President Lyndon Johnson. In the book, Kolwiecki first appears in 1965.

The Red Scare
When Tom Kolwiecki and the Concerned Citizens attempt to make the Co-op grocery to compete with the overpriced general store, the local newspaper deems them communists and claims that a Co-op is un-American. Arthur Lee also angrily claimed that VISTA, the government aid program that Tom was sent from, was a product of communism. Tom is not the only victim of the power of the Red Scare. During the mining strikes, orchestrated by Dillon Freeman, the impact is so great that there is federal involvement ( Agent Temple) in order to subdue the miners and force them back to work.

Novel themes
Peace and War
A major theme of this book was peace and war. Although the book wasn’t about a direct war it was about a war that took place between coal miners and large coal companies that often took advantage of those miners. Specifically, after WWII, Dillon comes back to find a completely different world because of the demand that is placed on the coal miner and the little respect that they are granted. A large portion of the book depicts their fight to gain their peace: their rights, their pay and their jobs. Every character of the book is involved in the war for peace because they all live in the coal town and are being directly affected by the strikes, the random FBI interactions, and other members in their family being coal miners.

Death
Another theme in the book is death. A lot of characters meet their death throughout the book and there is even the segment of the book where it is said that “nothing is permanent, not even death” because graves are being dug up in order to benefit coal companies. There is also the death resulting from Black Lung, mine roof collapse, Rachel’s heart problems, and many others. Different ways of dealing with death are found throughout the book as well as traditions and rituals. Dillon portrays the traditional approach to death by burying the trophy skull that Rachel brought back from the war. He believed that it should be respected, even if it was the enemy's. He also took great care of the family cemetery and wanted Rachel to be buried there in a simple and traditional way. Dillon also believed that death could tell a story. He goes to clean up the graves where a Polish coal miner had been buried in order to show it to Lech Walesa to get him to relate to the deaths in and of the coal mines. The death of coal mining towns was also included in the text. It shows the progress of the industry and how fewer people have the ability to stay in the area. As more of the jobs are mechanized, more people lose their jobs. The money stops following everywhere and the town starts to slowly die, one family and one business at a time.

Race
Race is evident in this novel from the struggles that the African American communities faced in the Appalachian towns to the ways they were segregated in the war. In the coal towns’ blacks were segregated sometimes in the camps into negro and white towns while others were completely mixed. Over in the war there were ‘negro troops’ separated from white troops.

Roots
The underlying theme of the novel is about homeplace and having roots. Emphasis is put on Dillon being deeply tied to Trace Mountain and the Homeplace where he grew up. Also we can see as the story progresses that Jackie, as Dillon’s daughter, also has these ties to land in her blood. Towards the end of the novel it is evident that Jackie has deep ties to Number Thirteen. Both Jackie and Dillon follow the theme of roots when together they go to the family cemetery to witness the moving of their family’s bodies due to American Coal buying the land for mining. When Jackie and Dillon return to the truck Dillon realizes their bond to each other, the land, and their family is so strong that he tells her she is his daughter. This is a great example of how roots tie the entire story together, as Rachel returns home to the Kentucky mountains and Dillon makes them his final resting place.

Forbidden Love
Another main theme of this novel is the idea of forbidden love between main characters Dillon and Rachael. Although they are first cousins, the pair experiences undeniable sexual attraction throughout the novel. Their first encounter occurs around 1940 on the courthouse lawn. This is where Dillon makes his first move by kissing Rachel and unbuttoning part of her blouse. This encounter sets up their romance for the rest of the novel, because it shows the turmoil this connection brings to the main characters. During this encounter Rachel says, “Dillon, we’re first cousins. We couldn’t have babies, there might be something wrong with them. And we can’t marry, it’s against the law.” This quote summarizes the theme of forbidden love throughout the novel by stating three main arguments against a potential relationship. However, Rachel and Dillon do eventually consummate their romance with a sexual encounter on Trace Mountain where they conceive a daughter, Jackie, who is attributed to her husband at the time, Tony. They continue their love affair through her marriage with Tony and once they are divorced Dillon, Rachel, and Jackie share a house together. Although, Dillon and Rachel do not share a bed in its most literal sense, however, Rachel continues to sleep with Dillon downstairs. Their relationship is a forbidden one but one they give into, even if only briefly, with little hesitation and the hesitation comes from Rachel alone.

Along with the theme of forbidden love, another prominent matter throughout the novel is the idea of having a child with someone related to you (in Rachel and Dillon’s case, first cousins). From the first chapter of this book, this idea is discussed and highly retorted. The subject is initially brought up when Rachel and Dillon are small children – “Dillon is your first cousin. You want to have babies that aren’t right? … I mean simple in the head. Deformed,” Flora Honaker abruptly states. This is something brought up many times throughout the first book. Rachel often explains her dilemma to her nursing school roommate and friend, Tommie. “… I miss him so bad. But he’s my cousin, so we’ve got no future,” Rachel explains, fighting back the urges of her forbidden love for Dillon. When Rachel and Dillon sleep together for the second time, Rachel immediately questions Dillon regarding their potential child together – “Do you think it would be all right? It wouldn’t be deformed?” Shortly thereafter, Rachel found out she was pregnant and later gave birth to her daughter, Jackie. Even though the father of Jackie was always in question throughout the novel, the subject of whether or not Dillon was the father and the issues that would come along with this was often brought up.

Power
Another theme that is intertwined all throughout The Unquiet Earth is power. We see the power of the coal companies, as they own and operate the coal towns and control the lives of its citizens. Everyone who resides within the coal camp, whether they are a miner, related to a miner or have another occupation within the camp are affected by the power of the coal company. The coal company owns the houses and, in a sense, owns the miners as well, as the companies control the amount of money put into the operation of the coal towns. The miners are treated terribly by the company and told what to do, when to work, and where to work. They have little concern for the miner’s safety or well-being, since high production is their number one goal. They are so desperate for workers, in fact, that the miners in the novel are even held by gun point and led to the mines against their will and forced to work as a result of the coal company: when Rachel looks out the window and sees men with guns take her neighbors to the mines to work against their will. Also, the coal company is trying to overpower the citizens and miners to prevent them from striking.

Strength
Strength is another very important, yet easily overlooked theme in The Unquiet Earth. We see the strength of the Appalachian women through Carrie freeman as well as through Flora Honaker. In the beginning of the novel we get quite a few examples of how strong of people these two women are. Carrie became pregnant from a man who was not her husband and this was looked down on by many of people in this time period. Despite how people looked at her she continued to do her job and raise her family. The father of her child had also died when the child was young so she practically raised him by herself. Floras' situation is a little different. She has to be strong in the aspect that her daughter is leaving to attend a nursing program, but Flora does not want her to do nursing. So she respects her daughter's decision and stays strong as she leaves. The women of this time period had to stay strong through hard times and situations.

Character list
Dillon Freeman
Dillon is one of three main characters in The Unquiet Earth. He is the main rebellious character of the novel running away from home, leading a strike, and blowing up a bridge to fight the coal companies. He is Rachel’s cousin and lover.

Rachel Honaker
Rachael is another main character in The Unquiet Earth. She is Dillon’s cousin and lover. Her first husband is Tony and she then marries Arthur Lee. She is the mother of Jackie. She works as a nurse in a mine free health clinic and later going around the town to houses as a nurse.

Jackie
Jackie is the last main character of The Unquiet Earth. She is the daughter of Rachael and either Dillon or Tony.

Flora Honaker
Flora is the mother of Rachael, wife of Ben, and sister of Carrie.

Ben
Ben is the husband of Flora and the father of Rachel.

Carrie
Carrie is the mother of Dillon and sister of Flora.

Tommie
Tommie is Rachel’s best friend and goes to work in the army with her as a nurse. Arthur Lee Sizemore is in love with her but they never marry because she dies overseas.

Tony
Tony is Rachel’s first husband and a bookkeeper at the mine.

Fred Sullivan
Fred was a boyfriend of Rachel’s while in Manila. He grew up in a rich family from New Orleans. He was a first lieutenant in charge of the ‘negro troops.’ Rachel and Fred dated throughout their time in Manila. When the war was over Fred and Rachel agreed to meet in West Virginia so he could marry her. After Rachel returned home there was never any news from Fred again. The two never married in West Virginia.

Arthur Lee Sizemore
Arthur Lee is the head of the mine who is first engaged to Rachels best friend (who dies in the war) but later falls for Rachel. Rachel moves in with him but never marries him.

Toejam Day'
Toejam is Jackie’s friend at number 13.

Agent Temple
Agent Temple is an FBI agent who investigates the conflict between the miners and the coal company.

Tom Kolwiecki
Tom is a volunteer from New Jersey who comes to Number 13 as part of the federal assistance program VISTA, though his presence is viewed with disdain by the local authorities. Tom becomes a Catholic priest after his Vista years in Number 13. He goes to work in Honduras for a while and eventually gets tortured and kicked out. He returns to Number 13 and sets up a Catholic mass for the community every Sunday.

Sim Gore
Sim was an African-American character in the book. He worked in the mines and later opened a car wash with Dillon.

Doyle Ray Lloyd
Doyle Ray is the son of an alcoholic father. He is the victim of his father's abuse. As a result of this abuse, Doyle Ray is a bully to the other kids. In the midst of an argument with his father, he accidentally shoots his sister, Brenda, with a rifle. Then he is sent to a reform school for two years. He later joins the army and is deployed to Vietnam. When he returns to Number 13, he becomes a preacher and he drives a coal truck for the coal company.

Hassel Day
Hassel calls himself the mayor of Number 13 and his goal is to work hard to get a new bridge built. After his brother, Homer, dies, he decides that once the bridge is built he will name it Homer Day Memorial Bridge. Hassel is the owner of the Dew Drop Inn. When the bishop visits to see Tom's progress with the Catholic mass in the community, Hassel gets the idea to help Tom out by gathering folks to go the service despite many unhappy feelings to go to a catholic service.

Ethel
Ethel was a woman working in the coal mines. She had a daughter, Tiffany, with Sim Gore's son Leon.

Buffalo Creek Flood
Buffalo Creek, which spans 17 miles, is located in a hollow of southern West Virginia’s Logan County and consists of three branches. More than thirty years ago, it was the location of one of the deadliest floods in U.S. history, the Buffalo Creek flood. Due to neglectful and inattentive strip mining and heavy rain in the area, a powerful flood swept through the hollow, killing 125 men, women, and children, as well as injuring over 1,000 people.

Prior to the flood on February 26, 1972, mining officials of the area, who were concerned about the condition of the highest dam, measured the water levels every two hours the night before due to the continuous onslaught of heavy rain. Although mining company officials were notified of the increasing danger, the residents of the hollow were not informed. At 8:05 a.m., the dam collapsed and about 132 million gallons of black waste water rushed through the narrow Buffalo Creek hollow. On top of the 125 deaths and thousands of injuries that resulted, over 4,000 people were left homeless. The flood destroyed 943 homes, resulting in overall property damage estimated at $50 million.

On her website, Giardina says: “The Buffalo Creek ‘flood’ was the heart of my young adulthood. It is the heart of The Unquiet Earth.” She states that an early draft of the novel placed the flood in 1972, when the real flood occurred. However, because Giardina believed that the event was "too dramatic and destructive" to be placed in the middle of the story, she placed the flood at the end in order to balance the novel.

References

1992 American novels
American historical novels
Novels set in Appalachia
Novels set in West Virginia